Catesbya is a genus of eel in the family Chlopsidae (false moray eels). It contains the single species  Catesbya pseudomuraena, which inhabits tropical reefs around the Bahamas in the central western Atlantic Ocean.

References

Chlopsidae
Monotypic ray-finned fish genera